Providence Island (Historically known as Perseverance, Dozoa Island, or Darzoe Island) was the site of the first successful settlement of American freedmen by the American Colonization Society in Liberia. It has been proposed as a UNESCO World Heritage Site by the government of Liberia.

History
After several unsuccessful attempts at colonization along the Pepper Coast, the American Colonization Society sent two agents, Robert F. Stockton and Eli Ayers, to negotiate with local chieftains to secure a place for colonization. A conference was held at Cape Mesurado, which the locals called Ducor. Reaching an agreement, known as the Ducor Contract, the Society acquired the land bounded on the north and west by the Atlantic Ocean and on the south and east by the Mesurado River, including Cape Mesurado and land on Dozoa Island in the bay. To ensure the validity of the purchase, Ayers and Stockton ensured that all the surrounding chiefs signed the document. It was executed by Gola chiefs Kaanda Njola of Sao's Town and Long Peter of Klay; Dei chief Kai-Peter of Stockton Creek; Kru chief Bah Gwogro (also George) of Old Kru Town; and chief Jimmy from St. Paul River. 

The colonizers established their first settlement in Liberia on Dozoa Island, which they renamed Perseverance and which was later renamed as Providence. In 2017, the Liberian Ministry of Information, Cultural Affairs and Tourism nominated the island for inclusion as a World Heritage Site.

Notes

References

Notes

Works cited

Islands of Liberia
Islands of the South Atlantic Ocean